Antimony Peak is a mountain summit on the east west divide of the Diablo Range and on the boundary of San Benito County and Merced County, California. 
It rises to an elevation of  just south of Frenchs Pass on the same divide and southeast of French Ranch.

References 

Geography of San Benito County, California
Geography of Merced County, California
Diablo Range